Michael Hills (born 11 June 1985 in Doncaster) is a rugby union player who plays at flanker for Doncaster Knights in the RFU Championship.

He represented England at the 2006 Under 21 Rugby World Championship. He has also played for the England Sevens.

Hills made 15 Premiership appearances for Sale Sharks and 24 in total, scoring one try against the Newcastle Falcons. In the 2005–2006 season, Hills made 2 appearances as Sale Sharks won their first ever Premiership title.

Hills signed for London Welsh in the summer of 2009.

References

External links
Sale Sharks Profile
England profile

1985 births
Living people
Rugby union players from Doncaster
Doncaster R.F.C. players
English rugby union players
London Welsh RFC players
Rugby union flankers
Sale Sharks players
People educated at Mount St Mary's College